Siratus coltrorum is a species of sea snail, a marine gastropod mollusk in the family Muricidae, the murex snails or rock snails.

Description

Distribution
Western Atlantic Ocean, Coast of Brazil

References

Muricidae
Gastropods described in 1990